Birthright is an American comic book series written by Joshua Williamson and drawn by Andrei Bressan, announced July 14, 2014 and released October 8, 2014. This monthly comic book series is produced by Skybound Entertainment and published by Image Comics.

When asked about where the idea for Birthright came from, Williamson says, "Destiny. I thought a lot about life and life goals. What do you do after you get what you want. If you set a big goal and then accomplish it… what happens next. Again, when I would watch movies, or TV shows, I always found myself interested in what came after."

In January 2018, Skybound Entertainment and Universal Pictures announced that a feature film adaptation was underway being headed up by Cinco Paul and Ken Daurio.

Plot
Days before his surprise birthday party, young Mikey Rhodes goes missing. No one is sure what happened — his father is accused of murder, his mother breaks down at the realization of her deepest fears, and his older brother watches as his family falls to pieces. All seems to be lost for the Rhodes until Mikey's miraculous return one year later.

But something is different; Mikey is back, but he's not the same boy they once knew. He's returned as an adult, having ventured into another world called Terrenos and being raised as a warrior, a savior. Filled with an extraordinary purpose, Mikey is now on a path to fulfilling a destiny larger, darker, and more dangerous than his family can imagine. Can Mikey be fully trusted? What happened in Terrenos, and what horrors have followed him back?

References

External links
Official Birthright Website
Skybound Entertainment's official homepage
Image Comics homepage

2014 comics debuts
Image Comics titles